Canoe marathon is a paddling sport in which athletes paddle a kayak (double-bladed paddle) or canoe (single-bladed paddle) over a long distance to the finish line. Many events are raced down sections of river, including currents or portages around obstacles. Some events attract thousands of competitors and are staged over several days.

Classes
Racers are generally divided into different classes though the available classes at each race will vary. Example classes are:
K1
K2
K4
C1
C2
C3
C6
OC1
OC2

K refers to a kayak, C a canoe and OC to an outrigger. The number refers to the number of paddlers in the boat. Some included on this list are very infrequently raced at the marathon discipline, but C1, C2 and K1 are virtually in every race. K1, K2, K4, C1, and C2 classes are permitted in International Canoe Federation events.

Events 
 ICF Canoe Marathon World Championships, an International Canoe Federation competition
 The MR340 is an annual  continuous race on the Missouri River from Kansas City to St. Charles, Missouri.  Participants have 88 hours to complete the race.
The course includes portages around 77 locks. There are no rules about the boat specifications but most competitors use ICF kayaks.
Classes include K1, K2, white water, touring kayak, and touring canoe.
Classes include K1, K2, white water and touring kayak.
K3s are also run.
 The YMCA Massive Murray Paddle,  down the Murray River in Australia. Classes include ICF canoes and kayaks, as well as touring craft as defined in Australian Canoeing regulations, surf skis, outrigger canoes and recreational paddle-craft such as sea kayaks.
 The Hawkesbury Canoe Classic.  down the Hawkesbury River in NSW Australia from Windsor to Brooklyn. The event is run at night (under moonlight on some years). Classes include canoes, kayaks and skis, as well as limited dragon boats. 
It must be completed in 100 hours. Classes include:
 Solo: USCA C-1, unlimited (any human powered boat)
 Tandem: USCA aluminum, standard, USCA C-2, unlimited
 Up to six crew: unlimited. The record time of 30 hours was done in a six-man canoe.
 the General Clinton Canoe Regatta, held in May on Memorial Day, one-day  race,
 the Au Sable River Canoe Marathon, held on last weekend of July, overnight  race, and
 the Classique international de canots de la Mauricie, held in September on Labor Day, three-day  race.
 The Adirondack Canoe Classic, also known as "The 90 Miler," is a three-day,  canoe race from Old Forge to Saranac Lake in the Adirondacks of New York, United States. Classes range from C1 Stock to war canoes and traditional guide boats. 
 La Ruta Maya: a four-day river race in Belize
The course includes 20 portages. Paddlers must carry expedition gear such as shelters and emergency rations. Classes include canoe (single and tandem), kayak, and stand up paddle board.
 The Yukon River Quest: a  wilderness paddling race from Whitehorse to Dawson City in The Yukon, Canada.  Classes include canoes and kayaks (single and tandem), and voyageur (six-person) canoes.
Classes include K1, K2, C1, C2 and voyageur canoes.

See also
 ICF canoe marathon
 Ice canoeing

References

 
Canoe racing
Canoeing and kayaking
Canoeing disciplines